Frederick Hayes Michaelis (March 4, 1917 – August 13, 1992) was an admiral in the United States Navy who served in World War II, the Korean War, and the Vietnam War.

Personal life
Michaelis was born on March 4, 1917, in Kansas City, Missouri. He married Rose Schiche of Lake Geneva, Wisconsin, with whom he had three children. Michaelis died on August 13, 1992, in Washington, D.C., and is buried with his wife at Arlington National Cemetery.

Career
After surviving the attack on Pearl Harbor, he became a Naval Aviator. Later in World War II, he was assigned to what would become Attack Squadron 12, which he eventually commanded in 1945. Later, he served on the staff of the Commander, Naval Air Forces (1955–1956), and with the Assistant Secretary of the Navy (AIR) (1956–1957). He was promoted to rear admiral in 1965 and vice admiral in 1969. Later he served as Commander, Naval Air Force U.S. Atlantic Fleet (1972–1975), and Chief of the Office of Naval Material (1975–1978), being promoted to four-star admiral in 1975. He retired in 1978.

Awards he received include the Navy Cross.

See also

List of United States Navy four-star admirals
List of USS Enterprise (CVN-65) commanding officers

References

1917 births
1992 deaths
United States Navy admirals
United States Naval Aviators
United States Navy pilots of World War II
United States Navy personnel of the Korean War
United States Navy personnel of the Vietnam War
American World War II flying aces
Recipients of the Navy Cross (United States)
Recipients of the Navy Distinguished Service Medal
Recipients of the Silver Star
Recipients of the Legion of Merit
Recipients of the Distinguished Flying Cross (United States)
Recipients of the Air Medal
United States Naval Academy alumni
Burials at Arlington National Cemetery
People from Kansas City, Missouri